A power tool is a tool that is actuated by an additional power source and mechanism other than the solely manual labor used with hand tools. The most common types of power tools use electric motors. Internal combustion engines and compressed air are also commonly used. Tools directly driven by animal power are not generally considered power tools.

Uses
Power tools are used in industry, in construction, in the garden, for housework tasks such as cooking, cleaning, and around the house for purposes of driving (fasteners), drilling, cutting, shaping, sanding, grinding, routing, polishing, painting, heating and more.

Classification
Power tools are classified as either stationary or portable, where portable means hand-held. Portable power tools have obvious advantages in mobility. Stationary power tools, however, often have advantages in speed and precision. A typical table saw, for instance, not only cuts faster than a regular hand saw, but the cuts are smoother, straighter, and more square than what is normally achievable with a hand-held power saw. Some stationary power tools can produce objects that cannot be made in any other way. Lathes, for example,  produce truly round objects.

Stationary power tools for metalworking are usually called machine tools. The term machine tool is not usually applied to stationary power tools for woodworking, although such usage is occasionally heard, and in some cases, such as drill presses and bench grinders, exactly the same tool is used for both woodworking and metalworking.

Health impact

While hand-held power tools are extremely helpful, they also produce large amounts of noise, vibrations and particulates including ultrafine particles.

Currently there seems to be no or little regulations on the size and amount of dust emitted by power tools. Some industry standards do exist, though it appears that they are not widely known or used globally. Knowing that dust is generated throughout the construction process and can cause serious health hazards, manufacturers are now marketing power tools that are equipped with dust collection system (e.g. HEPA vacuum cleaner) or integrated water delivery system which extract the dust after emmision. However, the use of such products is still not common in most places.

Using power tools without hearing protection over a long period of time can put a person at risk for hearing loss. The US National Institute for Occupational Safety and Health (NIOSH) has recommended that a person should not be exposed to noise at or above 85 dB, for the sake of hearing loss prevention. Most power tools, including drills, circular saws, belt sanders, and chainsaws, operate at sound levels above the 85 dB limit, some even reaching over 100 dB. NIOSH strongly recommends wearing hearing protection while using these kinds of power tools.

History
Early industrial revolution-era factories had batteries of power tools driven by belts from overhead shafts. The prime power source was a water wheel or (later) a steam engine. The introduction of the electric motor (and electric distribution networks) in the 1880s made possible the self-powered stationary and portable tools we know today. The global market for power tools is $33 billion (in 2016) and estimated to reach $46 billion in 2025.

Safety Enhancement
Prior to the 1930s, power tools were often housed in cast metal housings. The cast metal housings were heavy, contributing to repetitive use injuries, as well as conductive - often shocking the user. As Henry Ford adapted to the manufacturing needs of World War II, he requested that A. H. Peterson, a tool manufacturer, create a lighter electric drill that was more portable for his assembly line workers.  At this point, the Hole-Shooter, a drill that weighed 5 lbs. was created by A. H. Peterson. The Peterson Company eventually went bankrupt after a devastating fire and recession, but the company was auctioned off to A. F. Siebert, a former partner in the Peterson Company, in 1924 and became the Milwaukee Electric Tool Company.

In the early 1930s, companies started to experiment with housings of thermoset polymer plastics. In 1956, under the influence of Hans Erich Slany, Robert Bosch GmbH was one of the first companies to introduce a power tool housing made of glass filled nylon.

Energy sources
As of 2021, an electric motor is the most popular choice to power stationary tools. Other power sources include steam engines, direct burning of fuels and propellants, such as in powder-actuated tools, or even natural power sources such as wind or moving water. Iln the past stationary tools were powered by windmills, water wheels, and steam. Some museums and hobbyists still maintain and operate stationary tools powered by these older power sources. Portable electric tools may be either corded or battery-powered. Compressed air is the customary power source for nailers and paint sprayers. A few tools (called powder-actuated tools) are powered by explosive cartridges. Tools that run on gasoline or gasoline-oil mixes are made for outdoor use; typical examples include most chainsaws and string trimmers. Other tools like blowtorches will burn their fuel externally to generate heat. Compressed air is universally used where there is a possibility of fuel or vapor ignition - such as automotive workshops. Professional level electric tools differ from DIY or 'consumer' tools by being double insulated and not earthed - in fact, they must not be earthed for safety reasons.

Battery types 
Different battery powered power tools often use batteries which are not be compatible across brands and models. This may cause vendor lock-in, and results in poor sustainability if and when either the battery, charger or power tool component fails, resulting in potentially all having to be replaced.

Examples of battery differences include the battery technologies themselves, with nickel-metal hydride (NiMH) and nickel–cadmium batteries (Ni-Cd) being common previously, but as of 2021 lithium-ion batteries have become the de facto standard for new power tools. The voltage is one of the most important factors for battery compatibility. In simple terms, a higher voltage rating on the tool often means that the power tool can deliver more power, with all else being equal. Using a battery with the wrong voltage rating may damage the tool, persons or surroundings. As of 2021, 18 volt battery packs are the de facto standard in new power tools. The ampere hour, in simple terms, tells something about how long the power tool can operate before it needs to be recharged. If comparing two batteries with the same battery technology and same voltage rating, a battery with twice the amp hour rating should last about twice as long. In practice there may however be some variations to this. Also, batteries with a higher amp hour rating in practice can also often let the power tool deliver a slightly higher peak power due to the ability to deliver a higher current.

Even when using the same battery technology, voltage rating and amp hour rating, the interface of batteries for power tools are often not compatible across different manufacturers, and sometimes also not even within the same brand or product line. There are examples of aftermarket adapters being made so that the user can mix and match batteries between well-known brands, but these often do not fully implement the tools battery safety and monitoring systems and the use is done at the user's own risk.

There are initiatives with the goal that the same battery can be used across products from several manufacturers. In June 2018 nine companies presented a manufacturer-overlapping system for rechargeable batteries called "Cordless Alliance System" (CAS). It is based on Metabo's 18 Volt battery system. In 2020, Bosch initiated the "Power For All Alliance". Notably, the alliance consists of the brands Gardena, Gloria, Wagner and Rapid. However, the Power For All Alliance batteries will only be used on Bosch's consumer tools in the Bosch Home & Garden line and Bosch Home Appliances line. The Bosch professional ("blue") tools will still have its own battery and charger system which is incompatible with the Power For All batteries. Furthermore, since the Power For All tool-to-battery interface is not an open standard, it is unlikely that other manufacturers can join in on the standard. Still, the initiative may be seen as an important step towards starting a standardization of battery interfaces on modern power tools.

Types 
Power tools include:

Air compressor
Alligator shear
Angle grinder
Bandsaw
Belt sander
Biscuit joiner
Ceramic tile cutter
Chainsaw
Circular saw
Concrete mixer
Concrete saw
Cold saw
Crusher
Diamond blade
Diamond tool
Die grinder
Disc cutter
Disc sander
Drill
Floor sander
Food processor
Grinding machine
Heat gun
Hedge trimmer
Impact driver
Impact wrench
Iron
Jackhammer
Jointer
Jigsaw
Knitting machine
Lathe
Lawn mower
Leaf blower
Miter saw
Multi-tool
Nail gun (electric and battery as well as powder actuated)
Needlegun scaler
Pneumatic torque wrench
Powder-actuated tools
Power wrench
Pressure washer
Radial arm saw
Random orbital sander
Reciprocating saw
Rotary saw
Rotary tool
Rotary tiller
Sabre saw
Sander
Scrollsaw
Sewing machine
Snow blower
Steel cut off saw
String trimmer
Table saw
Thickness planer
Wall chaser
Washing machine
Wood router

Producers

See also
 Antique tools
 Cutting tools
 Garden tools
 Hand arm vibrations
 NIOSH Power Tools Database

References

External linkis